Shimi may refer to:
 a figure in the Bible; see Shimi (biblical figure)
 Shimi, Iran, a village in Semnan Province, Iran